Diplomacy in the Revolutionary War had an important impact on the Revolution, as the United States evolved an independent foreign policy.

Continental Congressional diplomacy

Before the Revolutionary war, extra-colonial relations were handled in London.  The colonies sent agents there. The colonies held several inter-colonial conferences, finally ending with the Continental Congress. The colonies were subject to European peace settlements, settlements with Indian tribes, and inter-colony (between colonies) agreements.

Starting in 1772, several colonies formed Committees of Correspondence. Parliament enacted the Tea Act, in 1773, and after the Boston Tea Party, the Boston Port Act, Massachusetts Government Act, (or Intolerable Acts), in 1774.  The Continental Congress established a Committee of Correspondence, which in 1789, became the Department of Foreign Affairs.

Conciliatory Resolution

Lord North took the uncharacteristic role of conciliator for the drafting of a resolution which was passed on February 20, 1775.  It was an attempt to reach a peaceful settlement with the Thirteen Colonies immediately prior to the outbreak of the American Revolutionary War; it declared that any colony that contributed to the common defense and provided support for the civil government, and the administration of justice (i.e. against any anti-Crown rebellion) would be relieved of paying taxes or duties except those necessary for the regulation of commerce; it was addressed and sent to the individual colonies, and intentionally ignored the Continental Congress.

Lord North hoped to divide the colonists amongst themselves, and thus weaken any revolution/independence movements (especially those represented by the Continental Congress).

The resolution proved to be "too little, too late", and the American Revolutionary War began at Lexington, on April 19, 1775.  The Continental Congress released a report, (written by Benjamin Franklin, Thomas Jefferson, John Adams, and Richard Henry Lee), dated July 31, 1775, rejecting it.

Olive Branch Petition

When the Second Continental Congress convened in May 1775, most delegates followed John Dickinson in his quest to reconcile with George III of Great Britain.  However, a smaller group of delegates led by John Adams believed that war was inevitable (or had already started), but remained quiet.  This decision allowed John Dickinson, and his followers to pursue whatever means of reconciliation they wanted: the Olive Branch Petition was approved.  It was first drafted by Thomas Johnson, but John Dickinson found the language too offensive, and he rewrote most of the document, although some of the conclusions remained. The letter was approved on 5 July, but signed and sent to London, on 8 July 1775. It appealed to George III by saying that the colonists were upset with ministerial policy, not the king's policies.

Letters to the inhabitants of Canada

In 1774, the British Parliament enacted the Quebec Act, along with other legislation that was labeled by American colonists as the Intolerable Acts.  This measure guaranteed (among other things) the rights of French Canadians to practice Roman Catholicism.

The Letters to the inhabitants of Canada were three letters written by the First and Second Continental Congresses in 1774, 1775, and 1776 to communicate directly with the population of the Province of Quebec, formerly the French province of Canada, which had no representative system at the time. Their purpose was to draw the large French-speaking population to the American revolutionary cause. This goal ultimately failed, and Quebec, along with the other northern provinces of British America remained in British hands. The only significant assistance that was gained was the recruitment of two regiments totalling less than 1,000 men.

Envoys to France
In December 1775, Vergennes sent Julien Alexandre Achard de Bonvouloir, a secret messenger to sound out the Continental Congress.  He met with the Committee of Secret Correspondence.

Early in 1776, Silas Deane was sent to France, by Congress in a semi-official capacity, to induce the French government to lend its financial aid to the colonies.  On arriving in Paris, Deane at once opened negotiations with Vergennes, and Beaumarchais, securing through Roderigue Hortalez and Company, the shipment of many arms and munitions to America.  He also enlisted the services of a number of Continental soldiers of fortune, among whom were Lafayette, Baron Johann de Kalb, Thomas Conway, Casimir Pulaski, and Baron von Steuben.

Arthur Lee, was appointed correspondent of Congress in London in 1775.  He was dispatched as an envoy to Spain and Prussia to gain their support for the rebel cause.  King Frederick the Great strongly disliked the British, and impeded its war effort in subtle ways, such as blocking the passage of Hessians. However, British trade was too important to lose, and there was risk of attack from Austria, so he pursued a peace policy and officially maintained strict neutrality.  Spain was willing to make war on Britain, but pulled back from full-scale support of the American cause because it intensely disliked republicanism, which was a threat to its Latin American Empire.

In December 1776, Benjamin Franklin was dispatched to France as commissioner for the United States.  Franklin remained in France until 1785.

Early US recognition

The Dutch and assistance

In 1776, the United Provinces were the first country to salute the Flag of the United States, leading to growing British suspicions of the Dutch. In 1778 the Dutch refused to be bullied into taking Britain's side in the war against France.  The Dutch were major suppliers of the Americans. In 13 months from 1778 to 1779, for example, 3,182 ships cleared the island of Sint Eustatius, in the West Indies.  When the British started to search all Dutch shipping for weapons for the rebels, the Republic officially adopted a policy of armed neutrality.  Britain declared war in December 1780, before the Dutch could join the League of Armed Neutrality.  This resulted in the Fourth Anglo-Dutch War, which diverted British resources, but ultimately confirmed the decline of the Dutch Republic.

In 1782 John Adams negotiated loans of $2 million for war supplies, by Dutch bankers. On March 28, 1782, after a petition campaign on behalf of the American cause organised by Adams and the Dutch patriot politician Joan van der Capellen, the United Netherlands recognized American independence, and subsequently signed a treaty of commerce and friendship.

Morocco and protection
Sultan Mohammed III of Morocco declared on 20 December 1777 that American merchant ships would be under the protection of the Sultan of Morocco and could thus enjoy safe passage. The Moroccan-American Treaty of Friendship in 1786 became the oldest non-broken U.S. friendship treaty.

France and alliance

The Franco-American Alliance (also called the Treaty of Alliance) was a pact between France and the Second Continental Congress, representing the United States government, ratified in May 1778.

Franklin, with his charm offensive, was negotiating with Vergennes, for increasing French support, beyond the covert loans and French volunteers.  With the American victory at the Battle of Saratoga, the French formalized the alliance against their British enemy; Conrad Alexandre Gérard de Rayneval conducted the negotiations with the American representatives, Franklin, Silas Deane, and Arthur Lee.  Signed on February 6, 1778, it was a defensive alliance where the two parties agreed to aid each other in the event of British attack. Further, neither country would make a separate peace with London, until the independence of the Thirteen Colonies was recognized.

The French strategy was ambitious, and even a large-scale invasion of Britain was contemplated. France believed it could defeat the British within two years.

In March 1778, Gérard de Rayneval sailed to America with d'Estaing's fleet; he received his first audience of Congress on August 6, 1778, as the first accredited Minister from France to the United States.

British peace initiatives

Staten Island Peace Conference

The Staten Island Peace Conference was a brief and unsuccessful meeting designed to bring an end to the American Revolution. The conference took place on September 11, 1776, on Staten Island, New York.

In early September 1776, after the British victory at the Battle of Long Island, Admiral Lord Howe, having been appointed Acting Peace Commissioner by King George III, met with John Adams, Benjamin Franklin and Edward Rutledge to hold discussions. Lord Howe initially sought to meet the men as private citizens (he had known Franklin prior to the war), but he agreed to the Americans' demand that he recognize them as the official representatives of Congress. The Americans insisted for any negotiations to require British recognition of their independence. Lord Howe stated that he did not have the authority to meet their demand. The British resumed the campaign at the Landing at Kip's Bay.

The commission was mandated by the Crown to offer the rebel Americans pardons with some exceptions, to allow judges to serve on condition of good behaviour, and to promise to discuss colonial grievances (except the Quebec Act) in exchange for a ceasefire, the dissolution of the Continental Congress, the re-establishment of the prewar (traditional) colonial assemblies, the acceptance of Lord North's Conciliatory Proposal, and compensation for the Loyalists who had been adversely affected by the war.

Carlisle Peace Commission

In 1778, after the British defeat at Saratoga (concluded Oct. 17, 1777) and fearful of French recognition of American independence, Prime Minister Lord North had repealed (February 1778) the Tea Act and the Massachusetts Government Act. As far as the Americans were concerned, it was far too late.

A commission was sent to negotiate a settlement with the Americans and was organized by William Eden, with George Johnstone, and headed by Frederick Howard, 5th Earl of Carlisle.  However, they left only after news of the Treaty of Alliance had reached London. Arriving in Philadelphia, the Commission sent a package of proposals to Congress. Among the terms of the commission, it was proposed:

More effectually to demonstrate our good intentions, we think proper to declare, even in this our first communication, that we are disposed to concur in every satisfactory and just arrangement towards the following among other purposes: To consent to a cessation of hostilities, both by sea and land. To restore free intercourse, to revive mutual affection, and restore the common benefits of naturalisation through the several parts of this empire. To extend every freedom to trade that our respective interests can require. To agree that no military force shall be kept up in the different states of North America, without the consent of the general congress, or particular assemblies. To concur in measures calculated to discharge the debts of America, and raise the value and credit of the paper circulation. To perpetuate our union, by a reciprocal deputation of an agent or agents from the different states, who shall have the privilege of a seat and voice in the parliament of Great Britain; or, if sent from Britain, to have in that case a seat and voice in the assemblies of the different states to which they may be deputed respectively, in order to attend to the several interests of those by whom they are deputed. In short, to establish the power of the respective legislatures in each particular state, to settle its revenue, its civil and military establishment, and to exercise a perfect freedom of legislation and internal government, so that the British states throughout North America, acting with us in peace and war, under our common sovereign, may have the irrevocable enjoyment of every privilege that is short of a total separation of interest, or consistent with that union of force, on which the safety of our common religion and liberty depends.

However, the British Army had left Philadelphia for New York, which stiffened the resolve of Congress to insist upon recognition of independence, a power that had not been given to the commission.

Clinton–Arbuthnot Peace Declaration
In December 1780, the commanders-in-chief of the British forces in North America, Sir Henry Clinton and Vice-Admiral Mariot Arbuthnot, were appointed as the Crown's commissioners "for restoring Peace to the Colonies and Plantations in North America, and for granting Pardon to such of his Majesty's Subjects now in Rebellion as shall deserve the Royal Mercy." The Patriots ignored it.

Native Americans

The Treaty of Fort Pitt, also known as the Treaty with the Delawares (Lenape) or the Fourth Treaty of Pittsburgh, was signed on 17 September 1778 and was the first written treaty between the new United States of America and any American Indians—the Lenape in this case. Although many informal treaties were held with Native Americans during the American Revolution years of 1775–1783, this was the only one that resulted in a formal document. It was signed at Fort Pitt, Pennsylvania, site of present-day downtown Pittsburgh. It was essentially a formal treaty of alliance.  It was largely unsuccessful as the majority of Indian tribes sided with the British.

Relations with Spain

In 1777, a new Prime Minister, José Moñino y Redondo, Count of Floridablanca had come to power, and had a reformist agenda that drew on many of the English liberal traditions. Spain's economy depended almost entirely on its colonial empire in the Americas, and due to unrest the reforms caused there among the native Creole aristocracy, the Spanish Court was worried about the US independence from colonial status because they had been held by another European Great Power. With such considerations in mind, Spain persistently rebuffed John Jay's attempts to establish diplomatic relations.

Though Spain was a co-belligerent with the Americans against the British, it did not recognize the United States' independence nor establish formal relations until nearly the end of the war. But the Spanish governor of Louisiana, Bernardo de Gálvez, had been informally cooperating with the Americans at the direction of the Spanish Court since at least 1776.

After France initiated its Anglo-French War of 1778-83, it invoked their Bourbon Family Compact with Spain, an alliance that had been in place since the Bourbons had become Spain's ruling dynasty in 1713. The secret Franco-Spanish Treaty of Aranjuez was signed on 12 April 1779. France agreed to aid Spain in the capture of British-held territory in Gibraltar adjacent Spain, East Florida, West Florida and the island of Menorca in the Mediterranean. On 21 June 1779, Spain declared war on Britain to join France, but it did not join the Franco-American alliance of 1778 that guaranteed US independence. Britain recognized the independence of the United States in the Treaty of Paris, officially ending the American Revolution, signed 3 Sept 1783. On the other hand, Spain was one of the last participants of wars against Britain to acknowledge the independence of the United States.

Neutrals

Britain's diplomacy failed during the American Revolutionary War. Most of Europe was officially neutral, but the elites and public opinion typically favoured the American Patriots, such as in Sweden, and Denmark. Britain not only could not find volunteer manpower to fill the ranks of an army in America to put down fellow Englishmen, internationally it had support of only a few small German states that hired out mercenaries directly to George III for his American service.

The First League of Armed Neutrality was an alliance between 1780 and 1783 of the three eastern European Great Powers, all with Enlightenment monarchs. They furthered free trade by protecting neutral shipping against the British Royal Navy's Mercantilist policy to restrict trade in its rebelling colonies. British warships practiced unlimited searches, boarding neutral shipping to look for French contraband.

Portugal, a close ally of Britain, remained neutral in the war.

Catherine the Great set up the 1780 League of Armed Neutrality with her declaration of Russian armed neutrality on 11 March (28 February, Old Style), 1780, during the War of American Independence. In it, she endorsed the right of neutral countries to trade by sea with nationals of belligerent countries without hindrance, except for weapons and military supplies. Russia would not recognize blockades of whole coasts, but only of individual ports, and only if a belligerent's warship were actually present or nearby.

Denmark and Sweden, accepting Russia's proposals for an alliance of neutrals, adopted the same policy towards shipping, and the three countries signed the agreement forming the League. They remained otherwise out of the war, but threatened joint retaliation for every ship of theirs searched by a belligerent.  When the Treaty of Paris ended the Revolution with US independence in 1783, The Hapsburg (Austrian) Empire, Prussia, the Holy Roman Empire, the Dutch Republic, Portugal, the Two Sicilies and the Ottoman Empire had all become members. Austria was invited to act as a mediator between France and Great Britain during the American Revolution. John Adams traveled to Vienna in 1781 to lobby for American independence.

The League of the 1780s succeeded in the short run by enabling trade with the US during wartime, and it contributed to "freedom of the seas" as an international principle. Militarily, although the Russian navy dispatched three squadrons to the Mediterranean, Atlantic, and North Sea to enforce this decree, Catherine called the alliance an "armed nullity", because the British Navy outnumbered all member fleets combined. Nevertheless, Britain had no wish to antagonize Russia, and subsequently its fleets avoided interfering with League members shipping.

Diplomatically the League of Armed Neutrality carried even greater weight. France and the United States of America were quick to proclaim their adherence to the new principle of free neutral commerce. While both sides of the Fourth Anglo-Dutch War tacitly understood it as an attempt to keep the Netherlands out of the League, Britain did not officially regard the alliance as hostile. The First League was followed in the Napoleonic Wars by the Second League of Armed Neutrality which was massively less successful and ended after the British victory at the Battle of Copenhagen.

Peace of Paris

The Peace of Paris was the set of treaties which ended the American Revolutionary War.  In June 1781, the Congress appointed Peace commissioners to negotiate with the British.  On 30 November 1782, preliminary Articles of Peace are signed by Richard Oswald, with representatives of the United States of America.

The path to negotiation
News of the surrender of Lord Cornwallis at Yorktown reached Britain late in November 1781, shortly before Parliament was due to debate the military spending estimates for the following year. The hastily revised plan was to retain forces in America at their existing level, but to abandon the policy of "offensive" war, in favour of a new approach, of defense against French and Spanish attacks in the Caribbean, and Gibraltar.

The negotiation process
Therefore, the decision was made to build on the "no offensive war" policy, and begin peace talks with the Americans. First, the stated aim of the 1778 Treaty of Alliance between the United States and France was specifically to maintain the independence of the United States. Second, for well over a year, informal discussions had been held with Henry Laurens, an American envoy captured on his way to Amsterdam and imprisoned in a small two-room suite at the Tower of London.  The British negotiator sent to Paris was the Scotsman Richard Oswald, a former business partner of Henry Laurens in the slave trade, who had been one of his visitors in the Tower of London. His first talks with Franklin led to a proposal that Britain should hand over Canada to the Americans.

British government changes again
On 1 July Lord Rockingham, the figurehead leader of the government, died, so Lord Shelburne was forced to take over, which led to the resignation of Fox, and a massive split in the anti-war Whig party in Parliament. Regardless of this, the remainder of the negotiations would be carried out under Shelburne's devious leadership (some of these negotiations took place in his study, now a bar in the Lansdowne Club). For example, he took advantage of the great delay in trans-Atlantic communication to send a letter to George Washington stating that Britain was accepting American independence without preconditions, while not authorising Richard Oswald to make any such promise when he returned to Paris to negotiate with Franklin and his colleagues (John Jay had by this time returned from Spain).

Diplomatic manoeuvres
Franklin became ill with gout towards the end of summer, but when John Jay learned in September of the secret French mission to England, by Joseph Matthias Gérard de Rayneval, and the French position on the fisheries, he sent a message to Shelburne himself, explaining in some detail why he should avoid being influenced too much by the French and Spanish. At the same time Richard Oswald was asking if the terms of his commission to negotiate with the Americans could be slightly reworded to acknowledge that the 13 so-called colonies referred to themselves as "United States", and about 24 September, the Americans received word that this had been done.

Great Powers at war and peace

The initial civil war between Great Britain and its rebelling thirteen colonies in Congress was broadened into a worldwide conflict between Britain and other European Great Powers. The English colonial insurgents in North America became the "centerpiece of an international coalition" to check and then compromise British preeminence in the North Atlantic. The rebelling Americans needed outside help if they were to be successful. Their "Continental" forces suffered repeated reverses early on. The cause of US independence flickered as its major port cities were either occupied or blockaded, its naval forces proved ineffectual, and its armies suffered repeated defeats in pitched battles at the hands of British regulars and their allied auxiliaries from German principalities.

Initially the Continental Congress persevered with financial contributions from the personal fortunes of the richest colonials to compensate for smaller states refusing to pay their full requisitions, It kept an army in the field by the leadership of George Washington and a flow of recruits from the largest states, especially Virginia, Massachusetts and Pennsylvania. Then came assistance from Dutch financiers and French covert military aid. French Enlightenment freebooters and European soldier-adventurers came to the aid of the embattled revolutionary forces. In 1778, the French Crown recognized the United States, in a trade treaty, followed by a defensive treaty that would become operative if Britain made war on France to interrupt its American trade. Article II of the military treaty included a French guarantee for US independence and it sovereign territory, including any territory conquered in Canada, Quebec, or Bermuda. Were Britain to initiate war with France for trading with the US, it would aid France to protect its West Indian possessions against British attack.

After the US Congress rejected its Carlisle Commission, Britain responded by taking aggressive action against any nation providing military assistance to the US Congress. It reasoned that violated Parliament's mercantile trade restrictions for its Thirteen Colonies. For Britain, the colonial civil war with Congress that began formally at its 1776 Declaration of Independence, now expanded into a war worldwide, beginning when France declared the Anglo-French War of 1778. By April 1779, Spain joined France to war against Britain in the secret Treaty of Aranjuez. Spain sought to reclaim the portion of its empire that it had lost to Britain at the last peace, including Gibraltar, Minorca, and the Floridas.

At that, France broke its military treaty of alliance with the US. First, the French-US treaty guaranteed US independence; but Spain neither joined their alliance as formally invited in Article X, nor did Spain guarantee US independence in the Franco-Spanish treaty. Second, the French-US treaty pledged France to war with Britain until US independence in Article XII; but its treaty with Spain pledged France to war with Britain until Spain gained Gibraltar, regardless of whether Britain agreed to US independence beforehand. And the terms of this secret Aranjuez treaty to gain Gibraltar were made without the knowledge or consent of the US as a party to the Franco-Spanish alliance against Britain. That directly violated Article IV of the French-US treaty. Third, in the French-US treaty Article VI, the French renounced all territory belonging to Great Britain. That provided for Britain to cede fishing rights to the US at Newfoundland, which it did at Anglo-US conclusive peace; but the Franco-Spanish treaty stipulates that they will conquer Newfoundland from the British and then share it only between themselves.

In 1780, to deter further aggression by Great Britain at sea, neutral Continental powers with continuing trade among Britain's thirteen rebelling colonies formed the First League of Armed Neutrality, including Austria, Russia, and Prussia. These insisted that the Anglo-Russian Treaty of 1766 provided for free trade among British dominions, only excepting military contraband or in view of a belligerent's stationary blockade on a port.

These additional conflicts around the globe with France and Spain strained Britain's resources for the war in America. The French blockaded Barbados and Jamaica, to damage British trade. The British defeated a French naval force on December 15 and captured St. Lucia. But in 1779, the French began capturing British territories, seizing St. Vincent and Grenada. Britain lost the Battle of Grenada badly in 1779. France and Spain failed to invade England, but a Franco-Spanish fleet decisively defeated a large British convoy bound for the West Indies off the Azores. The defeat was catastrophic for Britain. Spain failed to capture the British naval station at Gibraltar, but the British blockade of Spain and France proved ineffective.

Britain would choose to abandon imperial rule of its Thirteen Colonies, but instead rely on the British-US common history, family kinship, and trade. It would break any future US dependence on a military alliance with France by providing for a territory large enough to grow into a military power on the American continent. After giving up on the American colonies, the redirected treasury, growing navy, and enthusiastic home recruitment to take revenge on the French all combined to lead the British navy to victories around the world 1782–1784. Britain was able to dictate the terms and sequence in four separate bi-lateral peace treaties with the Americans, France, Spain, and the Dutch Republic.

Britain's response to the deal
The terms of the peace, particularly the proposed treaty with the United States, caused a political storm in Britain. The concession of the Northwest Territory and the Newfoundland fisheries, and especially the apparent abandonment of Loyalists by an Article which the individual States would inevitably ignore, were condemned in Parliament. The last point was the easiest solved—-British tax revenue saved by not continuing the war would be used to compensate Loyalists and many received free land in Nova Scotia. Nevertheless, on 17 February 1783 and again on 21 February, motions against the treaty were successful in Parliament, so on 24 February Lord Shelburne resigned, and for five weeks the British government was without a leader. Finally, a solution similar to the previous year's choice of Lord Rockingham was found. The government was to be led, nominally, by the Duke of Portland, while the two Secretaries of State were to be Charles Fox and, remarkably, Lord North. Richard Oswald was replaced by a new negotiator, David Hartley, but the Americans refused to allow any modifications to the treaty— partly because they would have to be approved by Congress, which with two Atlantic crossings, would take several months. Therefore, on 3 September 1783, at Hartley's hotel in Paris, the treaty as agreed to, by Richard Oswald the previous November, was formally signed, and at Versailles, the separate treaties with France and Spain were also formalised.

Treaty of Paris

The Treaty of Paris, signed on September 3, 1783, ratified by the Congress of the Confederation on January 14, 1784, and by the King of Great Britain on April 9, 1784 (the ratification documents were exchanged in Paris on May 12, 1784), formally ended the American Revolutionary War between Great Britain and the United States of America, which had rebelled against British rule starting in 1775.

The other combatant nations at war with Britain at the time were France in the Anglo-French War (1778), Spain with France by the Treaty of Aranjuez (1779), and the Dutch Republic in the Fourth Anglo-Dutch War. All three had other separate peace agreements with Britain for their respective imperial swaps of territories scattered worldwide; for details of these see Peace of Paris (1783).

Preliminary agreements
From 1782 to 1784 there were many diplomats in and out of Paris who were directly involved with international peace negotiations. They deliberated over three wars among four principle belligerents: first, the American Revolutionary War among Britain, the US and their French allies; second, the Anglo-French War (1778) among Britain, the French and their Spanish allies; and third, the Fourth Anglo-Dutch War (1780) between Britain and the Netherlands. In addition, the diplomats of Great Power nations among the First League of Armed Neutrality consulted one another and exchanged various proposals from their respective governments, especially those of Russia and Austria that Britain had invited to be mediators among the Great Powers.

The British-Thirteen Colony conflict had lasted over six years from 1775 Lexington to 1781 Yorktown. About three years into the conflict, France and the US struck an agreement at the Treaty of Alliance (1778) that promised those two would consult before concluding peace with Britain for US independence. Then the next year, France and Spain consorted in secret at the Treaty of Aranjuez (1779) to promise those two would fight until Spain gained Gibraltar, at the choke-point passage between the Mediterranean and the Atlantic. After the Yorktown defeat and Parliament's resolution to end American fighting, British Prime Minister Shelburne sought to separate the US from warring France by strengthening the American peace settlement so that in the future, the US would not depend militarily on France. He also sought to strengthen Britain with continued to trade with the future US. French Foreign Minister Vergennes sought to influence the "American Settlement" for the long term interests of France. He wanted to weaken the US militarily to ensure its future dependence on France in a perpetual military alliance against Britain.

In Paris, the three Great Power belligerents in the Anglo-French War floated distinctly different proposals for a mutual "American Settlement" apportioning territory for the United States. The first map shown is the French, the most restrictive of the US, with a western boundary at the Appalachian Mountains to match the British 1763 Proclamation Line, an item used to indict George III in the US Declaration of Independence. The second, Spanish map allows for additional Mississippi River Basin upland just west of the Appalachians for the US. But it also requires that the British cede its colony of Georgia to Spain in violation of the Franco-American alliance of 1778, and contrary to the British announcement for US independence by George III in December 1782. The third, British map was accepted by Congress in April 1783, with US territory west to the middle of the Mississippi River as a preliminary agreement. Congress had interpreted its national interest to be found in the peace treaty that ceded the most expansive territory considered by the European Great Powers. It trusted British treaty guarantees with bonds of history, family and trade over remonstrances from the ministers of France and Spain who were motivated by a secret treaty that the US had not agreed to.

The agreement
Based on preliminary articles made 30 November 1782 in Paris, the George III announcement for American independence in his December 5, 1782 Speech from the Throne, and approval by the Congress of the Confederation on 15 April 1783, this treaty was signed in Paris on 3 September 1783. Subsequently, ratified by Congress on 14 January 1784, that formality, along with British Parliament's ratification a month later, were then exchanged in Paris between the ministers of Britain and the US. Diplomatically, that third exchange of national intent between Britain and the US in Paris finally ended the American Revolutionary War between Great Britain and its thirteen former colonies which had formed the United States of America on 4 July 1776.

The treaty document was signed at the Hôtel de York –  which is now 56 Rue Jacob – by John Adams, Benjamin Franklin, and John Jay (representing the United States) and David Hartley (a member of the British Parliament representing the British monarch, King George III). Hartley was lodging at the hotel, which was therefore chosen in preference to the nearby British Embassy – 44 Rue Jacob – as "neutral" ground for the signing.

The American Congress of the Confederation ratified the treaty of Paris on January 14, 1784, and copies were sent back to Europe for ratification by the other parties involved, the first reaching France in March. British ratification occurred on April 9, 1784, and the ratified versions were exchanged in Paris on May 12, 1784. It was not for some time, though, that the Americans in the countryside received the news due to the lack of communication.

On September 3, Britain also signed separate agreements with France and Spain, and (provisionally) with the Netherlands. In the treaty with Spain, the colonies of East and West Florida were ceded to Spain (without any clearly defined northern boundary, resulting in disputed territory resolved with the Treaty of Madrid), as was the island of Menorca, while the Bahama Islands, Grenada and Montserrat, captured by the French and Spanish, were returned to Britain. The treaty with France was mostly about exchanges of captured territory (France's only net gains were the island of Tobago, and Senegal in Africa), but also reinforced earlier treaties, guaranteeing fishing rights off Newfoundland. Dutch possessions in the East Indies, captured in 1781, were returned by Britain to the Netherlands in exchange for trading privileges in the Dutch East Indies.

Full texts (French and English)
Jenkinson, Charles A Collection of All the Treaties of Peace, Alliance, and Commerce Between Great Britain and Other Powers vol. 3, pages 334 onward. London, Debrett (1785), via Google Books— accessed 2008-01-03

Treaty enforcement
Privileges which the Americans had received from Britain automatically when they had colonial status were withdrawn, (including protection from North African pirates in the Mediterranean that led to the First and the Second Barbary Wars). Individual states ignored Federal recommendations, under Article 5, to restore confiscated Loyalist property, and also evaded Article 6 (e.g. by confiscating Loyalist property for "unpaid debts").  Some, notably Virginia, also defied Article 4, and maintained laws against payment of debts to British creditors. The British also largely ignored Article 7, which called for the return of all runaway slaves who had escaped to British lines.

The real geography of North America turned out not to match the details, given in the Canadian boundary descriptions. The Treaty specified a southern boundary for the United States, but the separate Anglo-Spanish agreement did not specify a northern boundary for Florida, and the Spanish government assumed that the boundary was the same as in 1764, when Britain had enlarged the territory of West Florida. While that dispute continued, Spain used its new control of Florida to block American access to the Mississippi, in defiance of Article 8.

In the Great Lakes area, the British adopted a very generous interpretation of the stipulation that they should relinquish control "with all convenient speed", because they needed time to negotiate with the Native Americans, who had kept the area out of United States control, but had been completely ignored in the Treaty. Even after that was accomplished, Britain retained control as a bargaining counter in hopes of obtaining some recompense for the confiscated Loyalist property. This matter was finally settled by the Jay Treaty in 1794, and America's ability to bargain on all these points was greatly strengthened by the creation of the new constitution in 1787, and victory at the Battle of Fallen Timbers.

Aftermath

US ministers abroad
In 1784, the British allowed trade with the United States but forbade some American food exports to the West Indies, while British exports to America reached £3.7 million, and imports only £750,000.  This imbalance caused a shortage of gold in the U.S.
In 1784, New York-based merchants opened the China trade, followed by Salem, Boston, Philadelphia.
In 1785, John Adams was appointed first minister to the Court of St James's (Great Britain), and Jefferson replaced Franklin as minister to France.
In 1789, the Jay–Gardoqui Treaty granted Spain the exclusive right to navigate the Mississippi River for 30 years, but was not ratified because of opposition from Western states.
George Washington appointed John Quincy Adams United States Ambassador to the Netherlands in 1794, and to Portugal in 1796.
John Adams in 1797 appointed his son John Quincy Adams as Minister to Prussia.  There, Adams signed the renewal of the very liberal Prussian-American Treaty of Amity and Commerce after negotiations with Prussian Foreign Minister Count Karl-Wilhelm Finck von Finckenstein.

France
In 1793, a worldwide war erupted between Great Britain and France, and their respective allies. In April, George Washington issued a proclamation announcing the neutrality of the United States in the conflict among the belligerent nations of Europe.  America remained neutral until 1812, did business with both sides, and was harassed by both sides.

Britain
In 1795, the United States signed the Jay Treaty with Britain which averted war, and led to a decade of peaceful trade, but failed to settle neutrality issues.  The British eventually evacuated the Western forts, with boundary lines and debts (in both directions), settled by arbitration. The treaty was barely approved by the Senate (1795) after revision, and was intensely opposed.  It became a major issue in formation of the first party system.

Spain
The Treaty of Madrid established boundaries between the United States and the Spanish colonies of Florida and Louisiana, and guaranteed navigation rights on the Mississippi River. In 1797, the United States signed a peace treaty with the Barbary state of Tripoli.  However, this treaty was violated in 1801 by the Basha of Tripoli, which led to the Tripolitanian War. Also in 1797, the XYZ Affair erupted, with the humiliation of the United States government by French diplomats, leading to the threat of war with France, and ultimately the Quasi-War, an undeclared naval war from 1798 to 1800.

Ragusa
Ragusa (present-day Dubrovnik, Croatia), a major city with historical and cultural ties to Italy on the Adriatic Sea, was interested in the economic potential of the United States learned by its diplomatic representative in Paris, Francesco Favi.  He was in touch with Ferdinand III, Grand Duke of Tuscany at the request of the scholar Giovanni Fabbroni. The United States was anxious to conclude trade agreements with foreign powers during this period of the revolution. The American diplomat Arthur Lee learned that Italian merchants wanted to trade with the Americans but worried about the risk of corsairs or privateers. Since 1771, hides were delivered from Baltimore, New York City and Philadelphia to Marseille in France by ships from Ragusa. Ragusa entered into a trade agreement with the United States, and the Americans agreed to allow their ships free passage in their ports.

See also
 Diplomacy of John Adams
 History of U.S. foreign policy, 1776–1801

Notes

References

Further reading
, a standard history; online free to borrow
, a standard history

 Kaplan, Lawrence S. "The Diplomacy of the American Revolution: The Perspective from France" Reviews in American History (1976) 4#3 pp. 385–390 in JSTOR
Kaplan, Lawrence. Colonies into nation: American diplomacy, 1763-1801 (1972) online free to borrow

 Simms, Brendan. Three Victories and a Defeat: The Rise and Fall of the First British Empire, 1714–1783 (2008) 802 pp., detailed coverage of diplomacy from London viewpoint

Primary sources

 Commager, Henry Steele and Richard Morris, eds. The Spirit of 'Seventy-Six: The Story of the American Revolution As Told by Participants (1975) online

External links

Text of the Treaty of Paris (without Delaware)
Treaty of Paris, 1783 U.S. Department of State summary
A Select Bibliography of Diplomacy in the War of American Independence compiled by the United States Army Center of Military History
Documents Relating to the French Participation in the American Revolution. General Collection, Beinecke Rare Book and Manuscript Library, Yale University.

Peace treaties of the Netherlands
Peace treaties of Spain
1783 in France
1783 in Great Britain
1783 in the United States
1784 in the United States
Peace treaties of the United States
 
Boundary treaties
Canada–United States border
New York (state) in the American Revolution
1776 in the United States
History of Staten Island
Politics of the Russian Empire
18th century in Denmark
American Revolutionary War
Politics of Prussia
18th century in Sweden
18th century in the Ottoman Empire
18th century in France
19th century in France
1780s in the Dutch Republic
Peace treaties of the Kingdom of Great Britain
1783 treaties
Peace treaties of the Ancien Régime
History of diplomacy